Jean-Baptiste-Alphonse  is a given name. Notable people with the name include:

 Jean-Baptiste Alphonse Karr (1808-1890), French critic, journalist and novelist
 Jean-Baptiste-Alphonse Lusignan (1843-1893), French-Canadian writer

See also 
 Alphonse (disambiguation)

French masculine given names
Compound given names